"Sure Be Cool If You Did" is a song written by Rodney Clawson, Chris Tompkins, and Jimmy Robbins and recorded by American country music artist Blake Shelton. It was released on January 8, 2013, as the first single from Shelton's 2013 album Based on a True Story…. The song reached number one on both the US Billboard Country Airplay and Hot Country Songs charts.

Critical reception
Billy Dukes of Taste of Country gave the song three stars out of five, calling it "comparatively ordinary next to catalog hits like 'She Wouldn't Be Gone' and the infectious 'Honey Bee and writing that "a break in the name of artistry would satisfy fans of his rowdier songs, while giving those who discovered him on TV something more nourishing to listen to." Matt Bjorke of Roughstock gave the song three and a half stars out of five, saying that "the production of Scott Hendricks may not be as groundbreaking or as 'identifying' as say Jay Joyce or Joey Moi's productions are but the sound here is still likable - albeit a tad MOR."

Commercial performance
"Sure Be Cool If You Did" debuted at number 32 on the U.S. Billboard Country Airplay chart for the week of January 19, 2013. It was Shelton's second highest debut. In addition, the song entered in at number 44 on the Billboard Hot 100 for the week of January 26, 2013, and it sold over 98,000 downloads during its first week of release. The song also debuted at number 45 on Hot Country Songs for the week of January 19, 2013, and at number 43 on the Canadian Hot 100 chart for the week of January 26, 2013. On the country chart dated March 9, 2013, "Sure Be Cool If You Did" became Shelton's eighth consecutive number one hit, and his thirteenth overall. As of November 2013, the song has over sold 1,519,000 copies in the United States. It was certified double Platinum on May 8, 2015, by the RIAA for combined two million units of sales and streams.

Music video
The accompanying music video for this song was directed by Trey Fanjoy and premiered in February 2013. It depicts Blake singing the song in a city bar at night, and a wild party going on at the same bar. It was filmed mainly on vintage film, resulting in a grainy texture.

Charts

Year-end charts

Certifications

References

2013 singles
Blake Shelton songs
2010s ballads
Music videos directed by Trey Fanjoy
Songs written by Rodney Clawson
Songs written by Chris Tompkins
Song recordings produced by Scott Hendricks
Warner Records Nashville singles
Country ballads
Songs written by Jimmy Robbins
2013 songs